Pleasant Valley Methodist Church is a historic church in Hazlehurst, Mississippi.

It was built in 1840 and added to the National Register of Historic Places in 1996.

References

Methodist churches in Mississippi
Churches on the National Register of Historic Places in Mississippi
Georgian architecture in Mississippi
Churches completed in 1840
19th-century Methodist church buildings in the United States
National Register of Historic Places in Copiah County, Mississippi